Frida Svensson (born Johansson on 5 January 1970) is a Swedish track and field athlete who competed in the 400 metres hurdles. She represented Sweden at the IAAF World Championships in Athletics on three occasions, qualifying for the semifinals in both Tokyo 1991 and Stuttgart 1993. She also reached the semifinals of the women's 400 metres hurdles at the 1992 Barcelona Olympics.

She later married Swedish tennis player Jonas Svensson.

Singing
Together with Erica Johansson and Maria Akraka, she sang back up for Nick Borgen when he competed in Melodifestivalen 1993 performing the song "We Are All the Winners". The song placed second.

International competitions
All results regarding 400 metres hurdles

References

External links

1970 births
Living people
Swedish female hurdlers
Athletes (track and field) at the 1992 Summer Olympics
Olympic athletes of Sweden
21st-century Swedish singers
21st-century Swedish women singers